Peter John Michael Clarke, CVO, OBE, QPM (born 27 July 1955) is a retired senior police officer with London's Metropolitan Police most notably having served as a Deputy Assistant Commissioner with the Specialist Operations directorate, commanding the Counter Terrorism Command.

Early and personal life 
Clarke was educated at the Glyn School, Epsom and holds a degree in law and an Honorary Doctorate in Law from the University of Bristol.  He is married with three children. He lists cricket and rugby among his interests.

Career 
Clarke joined the Metropolitan Police in 1977, progressing through the ranks to reach inspector in 1984, becoming a detective inspector in 1986 before joining the National Drugs Intelligence Unit in 1988. Subsequently, promoted, Clarke became Operations Chief, Central London division in 1990 and staff officer to the Met commissioner in 1993 followed by three years as divisional commander, Brixton from 1994 to 1997.

Clarke then spent a further 3 years as a Commander, heading the Protection Command between 1997 and 2000, a role which placed him in charge of Royalty protection at the time of the death of Diana, Princess of Wales, followed by 2 years as deputy director of personnel from 2000 to 2002. In June 2002, Clarke became head of the Anti-terrorist Branch, later merged with Special Branch to form the Counter Terrorist Command, a role which put him in direct control of the investigations into the 7 July attacks on London, the failed bomb attempts of 21 July 2005 and the poisoning of Alexander Litvinenko in 2006.

Clarke retired as Assistant Commissioner Specialist Operations in February 2008, having delayed his retirement at the request of the then Commissioner, Sir Ian Blair, following the resignation of Andy Hayman.

Later life 
Clarke has been vocal in his retirement in campaigning for tougher legislation on terrorism.  More controversially this has including extended detention before charge for terrorist suspects, giving examples of where it has sometimes proven necessary to make arrests at an early stage in inquiries to protect the public sufficiently.

In April 2014, he was appointed to lead an investigation into Operation Trojan Horse, an alleged plot by Islamists to take over schools in Birmingham. Due to his background in counter-terrorism, Clarke's appointment was criticised by some, including local MP Khalid Mahmood.

In February 2016 he was appointed HM Chief Inspector of Prisons in a written statement to Parliament by Michael Gove. His appointment came to an end in October 2020.

Honours 
On 6 March 2001, Clarke was appointed Commander of the Royal Victorian Order, he was awarded the Queen's Police Medal in the 2003 Queen's Birthday Honours and appointed Officer of the Order of the British Empire in the 2006 New Year Honours for his work in July 2005 bombings.

{{center|

References 

1955 births
Living people
People educated at Glyn School
Alumni of the University of Bristol
Metropolitan Police chief officers
English recipients of the Queen's Police Medal
Metropolitan Police recipients of the Queen's Police Medal
Commanders of the Royal Victorian Order
Officers of the Order of the British Empire
People associated with the News International phone hacking scandal